Arangala Grama Niladhari Division is a Grama Niladhari Division of the Kaduwela Divisional Secretariat  of Colombo District  of Western Province, Sri Lanka .  It has Grama Niladhari Division Code 494B.

Arangala is a surrounded by the Evarihena, Hokandara North, Hokandara East, Hokandara South, Pothuarawa and Malabe West  Grama Niladhari Divisions.

Demographics

Ethnicity 

The Arangala Grama Niladhari Division has a Sinhalese majority (95.6%) . In comparison, the Kaduwela Divisional Secretariat (which contains the Arangala Grama Niladhari Division) has a Sinhalese majority (95.6%)

Religion 

The Arangala Grama Niladhari Division has a Buddhist majority (92.9%) . In comparison, the Kaduwela Divisional Secretariat (which contains the Arangala Grama Niladhari Division) has a Buddhist majority (90.4%)

Grama Niladhari Divisions of Kaduwela Divisional Secretariat

References